The City of Wellington by-election of 1892 was a by-election held on 15 January 1892 during the 11th New Zealand Parliament in the urban seat of the City of Wellington.

Background
The election was triggered due to the resignation of sitting Member Kennedy Macdonald amidst a bankruptcy claim. The contest was won by William McLean of the Liberal Party. McLean narrowly beat the conservative Francis Bell by 3,388 votes to 3,245.

The election was marred by a scandal over double voting. Over twenty cases of people casting votes more than once were discovered in a subsequent investigation. In his congratulatory speech to McLean, Prime Minister John Ballance also made reference to the scandal, alleging that the Tory Party had brought in outsiders to vote who had long ceased to be residents in the electorate.

Results
The following table gives the election results:

McLean held the seat until the 1893 general election, when he was defeated. Bell won a seat in Parliament for the Wellington electorate in 1893 and would go on to become Prime Minister more than three decades later. Macdonald was cleared of his bankruptcy charges but was not re-elected in 1893. He was later appointed to the Legislative Council in 1903.

Notes

References

Wellington 1892
1892 elections in New Zealand
January 1892 events
Politics of the Wellington Region
1890s in Wellington